Chromium(III) sulfide is the inorganic compound with the formula Cr2S3. It is a brown-black solid. Chromium sulfides are usually nonstoichiometric compounds, with formulas ranging from CrS to Cr0.67S (corresponding to Cr2S3).

Preparation
Chromium(III) sulfide can be prepared through the reaction of a stoichiometric mixture of the elements at 1000 °C

It is a solid that is insoluble in water.  According to X-ray crystallography, its structure is a combination of that of  nickel arsenide (1:1 stoichiometry) and Cd(OH)2 (1:2 stoichiometry). Some metal-metal bonding is indicated by the short Cr-Cr distance of 2.78 Å.

See also
 Brezinaite, a mineral with the formula Cr3S4

References

Chromium(III) compounds
Sulfides